Croton is an unincorporated community in southwestern Lee County, Iowa, United States. The Des Moines River flows past the southwest side of the community along the Iowa-Missouri border.

History
Croton's population was 96 in 1902, and 110 in 1925.

References

Unincorporated communities in Lee County, Iowa
Unincorporated communities in Iowa